Tate Creek is a stream in the U.S. state of Kentucky. It is a tributary to the Kentucky River.

Tate Creek was named after Samuel Tate, a frontiersman who ran up its course in the 1770s in order to escape Indians.

References

Rivers of Kentucky
Rivers of Fayette County, Kentucky
Rivers of Madison County, Kentucky